Nodwell Peaks are two outstanding peaks, less than 1 mile apart, on the east side of Edgeworth Glacier, Graham Land. It is situated 3 km north-northwest of Skidoo Nunatak and 5.2 km west of Maslarov Nunatak. Mapped from surveys by Falkland Islands Dependencies Survey (FIDS) (1960–61). Named by United Kingdom Antarctic Place-Names Committee (UK-APC) after Robin-Nodwell Mfg. Ltd. of Calgary, Canada, makers of Nodwell tracked carriers which were invented by Bruce Nodwell, and used in Antarctica since 1960.

Mountains of Graham Land
Nordenskjöld Coast